The 1953 Wichita Shockers football team, sometimes known as the Wheatshockers, was an American football team that represented Wichita  University (now known as Wichita State University) as a member of the Missouri Valley Conference during the 1953 college football season. In its first season under head coach Jack Mitchell, the team compiled a 4–4–1 record (1–2 against conference opponents), tied for third place out of five teams in the MVC, and outscored opponents by a total of 172 to 110. The team played its home games at Veterans Field, now known as Cessna Stadium.

Schedule

References

Wichita
Wichita State Shockers football seasons
Wichita Shockers football